Miss Grand Nepal 2020 was the third edition of the Miss Grand Nepal beauty pageant, held on August 13, 2020, at the Mojo Boutique Hotel in Baneshwor, Kathmandu. Ten contestants competed for the title, of whom a 21-year-old medical student from Kathmandu, Ambika Joshi Rana, was named the winner and crowned by Miss Grand Nepal 2019, Nisha Pathak. She then represented Nepal on the parent stage, Miss Grand International 2020, held in Thailand on March 27, 2021, but she went unplaced.

The event was showcased under the direction of the Izodom Nepal & Cosmo Group in association with Kantipur Hospital Pvt. Ltd.

Result

Color keys

Sub-Titles

Contestants

References

External links

 

Miss Grand Nepal
Grand Nepal